Cameron Humphreys may refer to:
 Cameron Humphreys (footballer, born 1998), English centre-back for Rotherham United
 Cameron Humphreys (footballer, born 2003), English midfielder for Ipswich Town